Eucalyptus rigidula, commonly known as stiff-leaved mallee, is a species of mallee that is endemic to Western Australia. It has smooth bark, linear to narrow elliptic or narrow lance-shaped leaves, flower buds in groups of nine or eleven, creamy white flowers and barrel-shaped to hemispherical fruit.

Description
The bark is smooth and white-grey brown in colour, powdery with no pith or bark glands and peels in ribbony strips at the base. Flowering occurs from December to April and the flowers are creamy white.

Taxonomy
Eucalyptus rigidula was first formally described in 1928 by the botanist Joseph Maiden in his book A Critical Revision of the Genus Eucalyptus. The type specimen was collected by Maiden in 1909 from near Comet Vale. The specific epithet (rigidula) is from the Latin word rigidulus referring to the "somewhat rigid leaves".

Distribution
The stiff-leaved mallee is found in heath and shrubland between the lower Murchidon River,  Grass Patch and the western edge of the Great Victoria Desert, growing in yellow or red sandy soils.

Conservation status
This eucalypt is classified as "not threatened" by the Western Australian Government Department of Parks and Wildlife.

See also
List of Eucalyptus species

References

Eucalypts of Western Australia
rigidula
Myrtales of Australia
Plants described in 1928
Taxa named by Joseph Maiden